Anthony Roczen (born 16 August 1999) is a German professional footballer who plays as a forward for NOFV-Oberliga Nord club RSV Eintracht 1949.

Career
Roczen made his professional debut for 1. FC Magdeburg in the 3. Liga on 28 July 2019, coming on as a substitute in the 78th minute for Sören Bertram in the 0–0 away draw against FSV Zwickau.

References

External links
 
 

1999 births
Living people
Footballers from Berlin
German footballers
Association football forwards
Hertha BSC II players
1. FC Magdeburg players
SV Waldhof Mannheim players
3. Liga players
Regionalliga players
Oberliga (football) players